Clutter and its derivations may refer to any of the following:

Excessive physical disorder 

 Clutter, a confusing, or disorderly, state or collection, and possible symptom of compulsive hoarding
 Clutter (marketing), numerous advertisements, announcements and promotions in media and radio, unrelated to the main presentation
 Clutter (radar), unwanted echoes in electronic systems
 Clutterers Anonymous, a twelve-step program for people who share a common problem with accumulation of clutter
 Visual clutter, or visual pollution

People 

 Clutter family, victims of the 1959 Clutter family murders

Arts, entertainment, and media 

 Clutter (album)
 Clutter (film)
 Clutter, a Portuguese djent/progressive/groove metal band

Other uses 

 Clutter (software), a GNOME software library for graphics
 Clutter, a Sperner family of sets (i.e., no set in the family contains any other)
 Cluttering, a speech and communication disorder when speech becomes broken or sounds nervous